The Party Is Over is a 1960 Argentine drama film directed by Leopoldo Torre Nilsson. It was entered into the 10th Berlin International Film Festival. The film depicts the political corruption in Argentina in the 1930s, a period known as the Infamous Decade.

Cast
 Arturo García Buhr as Mariano Braceras
 Lautaro Murúa as Guastavino
 Graciela Borges as Mariana Braceras
 Leonardo Favio as Adolfo Peña Braceras
 Elena Tritek as The Prostitute
 Osvaldo Terranova
 Lydia Lamaison
 María Principito
 Idelma Carlo
 Hilda Suárez
 Leda Zanda
 Juan Carlos Galván
 Santángelo
 Emilio Guevara
 Ricardo Robles

References

External links

1960 films
1960s Spanish-language films
1960 drama films
Argentine black-and-white films
Films directed by Leopoldo Torre Nilsson
Films set in the Infamous Decade
Argentine drama films
1960s Argentine films